Sundgren is a surname. Notable people with the surname include:

Christoffer Sundgren (born 1989), Swedish curler
Daniel Sundgren (born 1990), Swedish footballer
Gary Sundgren (born 1967), Swedish footballer
Jan-Eric Sundgren (born 1951), Swedish engineer and businessman
Nils Petter Sundgren (1929–2019), Swedish film critic and television presenter